Black Marxism: The Making of the Black Radical Tradition, first published in 1983 and again in 2000, is a book written by the scholar Cedric Robinson. Influenced by many African-American and Black economists and radical thinkers of the 19th century, Robinson creates a historical-critical analysis of Marxism and the Eurocentric tradition from which it evolved. The book does not build from nor reiterate Marxist thought, but rather introduces racial analysis to the Marxist tradition.

Synopsis 
Black Marxism is separated into three parts, the first being, “The Emergence and Limitations of European Radicalism;” the second, “The Roots of Black Radicalism;” and the third, “Black Radicalism and Marxist Theory.” Through these sections, Robinson critiques Marxism and its reliance on determinism. The primary theories which result from Black Marxism are racial capitalism and the Black radical tradition.

The book begins by introducing the theory of racial capitalism, the process of deriving social and economic value from the racial identity of another person. Robinson develops this term to correct what he thinks led Karl Marx and Friedrich Engels to mistakenly believe that European bourgeois society would rationalize social relations. Robinson says that “As a material force… racialism would inevitably permeate the social structures emergent from capitalism. I have used the term ‘racial capitalism’ to refer ... to the subsequent structure as a historical agency.” He argues that all capitalism is structured by ‘racialism’ and produces inequalities among groups. Thus, all capitalism should be recognized as racial capitalism.

In addition to theorizing on racial capitalism, Black Marxism aims to elucidate the Black radical tradition of the past, present, and future. Robinson recounts several acts of resistance, from seventeenth-century maroon communities in the Americas to twentieth-century national liberation struggles, looking to scholars W. E. B. Du Bois and C. L. R. James to exemplify the tradition.

Publication 
Black Marxism was first published in 1983 by Zed Books. It was republished in 2000 by the University of North Carolina Press, with an introduction provided by Robin D. G. Kelley. Black Marxism’s second edition received both praise and criticism from within the American political left.

Legacy 
Several writers have demonstrated and written about Black Marxisms relevance for 21st-century issues.

The Black Lives Matter (BLM) movement grounds its structural analysis of Black oppression in racial capitalism. Specifically, the organization Movement for Black Lives (M4BL) names racial capitalism in its 2020 policy platform, "A Vision for Black Lives". Scholars find it noteworthy that BLM continues to reach back to Black Marxism, suggesting that the book's theories have great significance for black radical movements of the past and present. Moreover, contemporary radical scholars champion Black Marxism for the extent to which it argues the link between contemporary anti-Black violence and historical structures of oppression.

The publication of Black Marxism has directed the agenda of Africana studies, as well as influenced the definition of radicalism in Black scholarship. The Black radical tradition provides a rich resource for future challenges of Africana studies and it acts as a bridge, helping academics to “understand the conceptual vocabulary used by ... activist-intellectuals who research and teach about the relationship between race and class … [and] to identify the concepts needed to transform the conditions under which the radical tradition now operates."

References 

African-American leftism
Books about Marxism
Marxism